Fausto Isidro Meza Flores (born June 19, 1982), commonly referred to by his criminal alias El Chapo Isidro ("Shorty Isidro"), is a Mexican drug lord and high-ranking leader of the Beltrán Leyva Cartel, a drug trafficking organization. He is also the alleged leader of Los Mazatlecos and was right-hand man of the now deceased drug lord Héctor and the incarcerated Alfredo Beltrán Leyva. The FBI is offering a US$5 million bounty.

Criminal career

Early life and ascension
Meza Flores (known in the criminal world as El Chapo Isidro) was born on June 19, 1982 in Navojoa, Sonora, Mexico. He began his criminal career in the 1990s, at first working for the Juárez Cartel under the tutelage of the then-leader Amado Carrillo Fuentes. After the drug lord died of plastic surgery complications in 1997, Meza Flores deserted the organization along with several other drug traffickers and decided to join the forces of the Beltrán Leyva Cartel. As a member of the Beltrán Leyva brothers, he proved to be a "skilled hitman, capable of daring, cunning and bravado." When the leader Arturo Beltrán Leyva was gunned down and killed by the Mexican military in December 2009, many within the cartel deserted and left to form an independent criminal organization with Edgar Valdez Villarreal, known as La Barbie. Meza Flores, however, remained loyal to the Beltrán Leyva brothers and possibly forged an alliance with Vicente Carrillo Fuentes.

Tubutama, Sonora shooting
A fierce gunfight between members of the Sinaloa Cartel (with the backing of Gente Nueva) and the Beltrán Leyva Cartel (with the support of Los Zetas and Los Mazatlecos Meza Flores' men) left about 30 dead in the town of Tubutama, Sonora in northern Mexico on July 1, 2010. The drug gangs clashed just a few miles across the international border with the U.S. state of Arizona – an area notorious for being a smuggling route for narcotics and human trafficking. Reportedly, Meza Flores and a drug trafficker called Arnoldo del Cid Buelna (known in the criminal world as El Gilo) were the ones that carried out the surprise ambush attack on the gunmen of the Sinaloa Cartel. Eleven late-model, bullet-ridden vehicles were found at the scene, along with dozens of assault rifles. Some of the vehicles had "X" painted on their windows, a method often used by the Mexican drug trafficking organizations to distinguish their vehicles from those of rival drug cartels during armed confrontations.

Los Mazatlecos era
His gang, Los Mazatlecos, is based in the region of Guasave , Los Mochis , Mazatlan in Sinaloa and Nayarit and is responsible for smuggling large quantities of methamphetamine, heroin, marijuana, and cocaine since 2000. He is one of the principal leaders of the Beltrán Leyva Cartel in the city of Mazatlán and in the mountainous areas of Sinaloa state. Since 2010, he is one of the leading rivals of the Sinaloa Cartel; the fight between the two drug trafficking groups has generated a wave of kidnappings and executions in Sinaloa. Meza Flores was the right-hand man of Héctor Beltrán Leyva (now deceased) the top leader of the Beltrán Leyva Cartel; his area of operations is in Mazatlán, Guamúchil, Los Mochis, Choix and Los Cabos. On April 28, 2010, Meza Flores was nearly captured by Mexican law enforcement in the mountains of Choix, Sinaloa. However, the operation left two soldiers dead and twelve of his gunmen killed, including his right-hand man Omar Alfonso Rubio (alias "El Chonte"). On December 12, 2013, one of Meza Flores's top lieutenants, Ignacio "Nacho" González was arrested in Guasave, Sinaloa by the Mexican Army.

Status
Meza Flores is a fugitive wanted by the United States government on drug trafficking charges. The FBI is offering a US$5 million bounty. His last known residence was in the state of Nuevo León, where he was reportedly seen with some of his family members at a youth basketball game in San Pedro Garza García on January 19, 2013.

Kingpin Act sanction
The Office of Foreign Assets Control (OFAC) of the United States Department of the Treasury announced on January 17, 2013 that they froze the assets of Meza Flores, seven of his family members, and three companies that had connection with his criminal organization through the Foreign Narcotics Kingpin Designation Act (sometimes referred to simply as the "Kingpin Act").

Businesses included in the sanction

Family members of Meza Flores

See also
List of fugitives from justice who disappeared
Mexican Drug War

References

1982 births
Beltrán-Leyva Cartel traffickers
Fugitives wanted by Mexico
Fugitives wanted by the United States
Fugitives wanted on organised crime charges
Living people
Mexican crime bosses
Mexican drug traffickers
People from Navojoa
People from Sinaloa
People of the Mexican Drug War
People sanctioned under the Foreign Narcotics Kingpin Designation Act